The Global Electoral Organization Conference (GEO Conference) is an invitation-only conference which aims to "bring together electoral practitioners and experts to exchange knowledge and share experiences, to provide a forum for networking, to present opportunities for provoking debate and promoting initiatives."

Collaborating Organizations
 ACE Electoral Knowledge Network
 International IDEA
 Southern African Development Community
 Electoral Institute for the Sustainability of Democracy in Africa
 Federal Electoral Institute
 Elections Canada
 IFES
 United Nations Electoral Assistance Division

Past GEO Conferences
In 1999, the first GEO conference was held in Ottawa, Ontario, Canada. The second GEO Conference was not held until 2003 in Mexico. The third GEO Conference was held in Hungary. GEO2007, the fourth conference, was held in Washington, D.C. Four year later, GEO2011 was held in Gaborone, Botswana.

External links 
 GEO1999 - 1st GEO Conference
 GEO2003 - 2nd GEO Conference
 GEO2005 - 3rd GEO Conference
 GEO2007 - 4th GEO Conference
 GEO2011 - 5th GEO Conference

Election and voting-related organizations
International conferences